E.H. in the U.K. is an album by American jazz saxophonist Eddie Harris recorded in England with prominent British rock musicians in 1973 and released on the Atlantic label.

Reception

The Allmusic review stated "most of the results aren't too different from what Harris had been recording at home at the time, with only a hint of a rock edge. If anything, the workmanlike Brits are too much on their best behavior".

Track listing
All compositions by Eddie Harris except as indicated.
 "Baby" – 6:45  
 "Wait a Little Longer" – 4:12  
 "He's an Island Man" – 2:25  
 "I've Tried Everything" – 8:13  
 "I Waited for You" (Charles Stepney) – 5:48  
 "Conversations of Everything and Nothing" – 15:54

Personnel
Eddie Harris – tenor saxophone, varitone, trumpet, acoustic piano, vocals
Zoot Money (tracks 1 & 2), Stevie Winwood (tracks 3–6) – electric piano
Tony Kaye – Moog synthesizer (tracks 5 & 6)
Jeff Beck (tracks 3 & 4), Neil Hubbard (tracks 1 & 2), Albert Lee – electric guitar 
Chris Squire (tracks 5 & 6), Raymond Burrell (tracks 1–3), Rick Grech (track 4)  – electric bass
Ian Paice (tracks 3 & 4), Alan White (tracks 1, 2, 5 & 6) – drums
Loughty Amao - congas (tracks 3 & 4)
Technical
Nesuhi Ertegun - executive producer
Roger Quested - recording engineer
Bob Defrin - art direction

References 

Eddie Harris albums
1974 albums
Atlantic Records albums
albums recorded at Morgan Sound Studios